The Jesus Miracle Crusade International Ministry (JMCIM) is a Christian church in the Philippines which believes particularly in the promotion of miracles, and faith in God for healing. They currently claim 1,500,000 members in the Philippines and other countries.  With more than 40 assemblies outside the Philippines, the bulk of their membership is within the country. It has members in the Philippines, the United States, Canada, Europe, the Middle East, Australia, Singapore, Japan, China,  South Korea,  and several parts of Asia . JMCIM is the largest Oneness Pentecostal organization in the Philippines, holding several services weekly at the Amoranto Sports Complex in Quezon City, Metro Manila, with Sunday attendance in the tens of thousands at that location alone. Their 40th Anniversary celebration in 2015 saw 300,000 people gather at the Cultural Center of the Philippines in Pasay, Metro Manila.

JMCIM is a highly structured organization with Almeda as its Dearly Beloved Honorable Evangelist-Pastor. He remains their only pastor. All other ministers have the title of Beloved Ministers or Beloved Preachers and work entirely under the governing authority of the church. Their members are referred to as Beloved Brethren. Almeda's wife, now deceased, is called Beloved Assistant Pastor Lina C. Almeda. The organization published a 252-page bilingual (English-Tagalog) Preacher's Handbook in 2011 that offers standard instructions for all ministers or preachers covering subjects including doctrines and how to conduct services for weddings, child dedications and so forth.

Doctrine

Summary
Like most Oneness Pentecostals, JMCIM strongly emphasizes a soteriology (doctrine of salvation) found in Acts 2:38, involving repentance, baptism in the name of Jesus Christ for remission of sins, and receiving the baptism of the Holy Spirit evidenced by speaking in tongues. In addition, they affirm that God manifested threefold as the God the Father (in creation), Son of God (in redemption), and the Holy Ghost (in regeneration or emanation), which are also the titles and functions of the one God. They maintain that the Lord Jesus Christ possesses a combined Godly and human nature, or dual nature. They also place a heavy emphasis on prayer, fasting, and healing, and promote strict standards of lifestyle and dress that portray modesty and self-control, a doctrine often referred to as holiness, which emphasizes complete separation from the world and worldly conduct.

The Holy Bible
The JMCIM believes and embraces the Word of God contained in the Bible, as the sole authority on all spiritual matters. The Bible is the inspired Word of God, so each and every belief and practices must strictly adhere to Christ’s teachings that can be found in the Scriptures. The King James Bible is the JMCIM’s official reference.

History
JMCIM was founded on February 14, 1975, by Evangelist and Pastor Wilde E. Almeda and his wife, Lina C. Almeda, in Novaliches, Quezon City, Metro Manila. Although Almeda was greatly influenced by American missionary John L. Willhoite, he only briefly held credentials with an American-run missionary organization, the very small Apostolic Ministers Fellowship (AMF). JMCIM is thus a totally autochthonous (indigenous) organization with a location in Novaliches, Quezon City.

In 1983, the church was registered to the Securities and Exchange Commission (Philippines) as the "Jesus Miracle Crusade International Ministry" or "JMCIM".

References

External links
 

Christian organizations established in 1975
Christian denominations founded in the Philippines
Oneness Pentecostal denominations